Gisborne District Council is the unitary authority for the Gisborne District of New Zealand. The council consists of a mayor and 13 ward councillors. The district consists of the city of Gisborne and a largely rural region on the east coast of the North Island.

Structure
Gisborne District Council is a unitary territorial authority, which means that it performs the functions of a regional council as well as those of a territorial authority (a district or city). The area it governs is constituted as both the Gisborne District and the Gisborne Region.

The council consists of a mayor and 13 elected councillors. Nine councillors are elected from the Gisborne Ward, and one each from the four wards of Matakaoa-Waiapu, Taruheru-Patutahi, Tawhiti-Uawa and Waipaoa.

Under the elected members, there is an appointed chief executive officer, 4 department managers and approximately 250 staff. The district council and main administration centre is in Fitzherbert Street, in the city of Gisborne.

History

Gisborne District Council was established in 1989 as part of a major nationwide reform of local government. It replaced the councils of Gisborne City, Cook County, Waiapu County and Waikohu County, East Cape United Council, East Cape Catchment Board and Regional Water Board, East Coast Pest Destruction Board, two harbour boards, and several noxious plants authorities and recreation reserve boards. It was the only unitary authority in New Zealand until three others were created in 1992. County councils had been formed in 1876, with the abolition of the Auckland Provincial Council. Uawa County had split off from Cook County in 1918, but merged back in 1964.

References

External links
 Official website

Gisborne District
Politics of the Gisborne District
Territorial authorities of New Zealand